is a Japanese voice actress and narrator who is affiliated with the Office Osawa agency.

Biography
She graduated from the University of Tsukuba. She began attending the Katsuta Voice Actor's Academy in her third year, and in January 1985 she debuted as a voice actress in OVA Greed. She first starred in a child's project in 1986. In the early 1990s, she transferred to the Office Osawa talent agency in order to work as a narrator.

Filmography

Television animation
1985
Mobile Suit Zeta Gundam (Mineva Lao Zabi)

1986
Bosco Adventure (Jenny)
Mobile Suit Gundam ZZ (Mineva Lao Zabi)

1987
Bubblegum Crisis (Irene)

1988
City Hunter 2 (Machiko Gamō)

1989
Aoi Blink (Princess Kirara)
Jungle Book Shōnen Mowgli (Kichi)

1992
Dragon Ball Z (Android 18)
Pretty Soldier Sailor Moon (Thetis, Princess Dia, U Bara, Arisu Itsuki)
Tokyo Babylon (Hokuto Sumeragi)

1993
Ghost Sweeper Mikami (Aiko)
Gunnm (Gally)
Mobile Suit Victory Gundam (Lup Cineau)

1994
Brave Police J-Decker (Eva Fahrzeug)
Magic Knight Rayearth (Nova)
Mahōjin Guru Guru (Churu)

1996
Dragon Ball GT (Android 18)

1997
Battle Athletes Victory (Jessie Gartland)

1998
Cardcaptor Sakura (Sonomi Daidouji)
Detective Conan (Eri Akechi (Eps. 379-380); Hatsuho Hōjō (Eps. 261-262); Miho Nishitani (Ep. 70))
Twinbee Paradise (Mint-Herb & Gwinbee)
Weiß Kreuz (Schoen)

1999
Angels of the Stars: Angel Links (Anne)

2000
Boogiepop Phantom (Makiko Kisugi)

2002
Saishu Heiki Kanojo (Fuyumi)

2003
Ashita no Nadja (Savellli, Julietta)
Kimi ga Nozomu Eien (Azusa Ishida)

2004
Aishiteruze Baby (Miki Sakashita)
Maria-sama ga Miteru (Sachiko Ogasawara)
Maria-sama ga Miteru: Printemps (Sachiko Ogasawara)

2005
Ah! My Goddess (Lind)
Hell Girl (Keiko Yasuda)
Kamichu! (Akane Hitotsubashi)
Shuffle! (Asa Shigure)

2006
Air Gear (Ryo Mimasaka)
Higurashi When They Cry (Miyo Takano)
Fate/stay night (Taiga Fujimura)
Ghost Hunt (Keiko Ubusuna)
Kenichi: The Mightiest Disciple (Kisara's mother)
Maria-sama ga Miteru (Sachiko Ogasawara)

2007
Baccano! (Natalie Beriam)
Gin Tama (Kujaku Hime Kada)
Higurashi When They Cry: Kai (Miyo Takano)
Myself ; Yourself (Aoi Oribe's mother)

2008
Glass Maiden (Monica)
Natsume's Book of Friends (Touko Fujiwara)
Tales of the Abyss (Legretta the Quick)

2009
 Maria-sama ga Miteru (Sachiko Ogasawara)
 Umineko no Naku Koro ni (Eva Ushiromiya)

2010
The World God Only Knows (Okada)
Stitch! ~Best Friends Forever~ (Carmen)

2011
Freezing (Olivia el Bridget)
Gosick (Kazuya's mother)
Persona 4: The Animation (Eri Minami)

2012
From the New World (Mizuho Watanabe)

2013
Fate/kaleid liner Prisma Illya (Taiga Fujimura)
Magi: The Kingdom of Magic (Ren Gyokuen)

2014
 Fate/stay night: Unlimited Blade Works (2014) (Taiga Fujimura)
Glasslip (Suzune Nagamiya)
Noragami (Mrs. Iki)

2015
Dragon Ball Super (Android 18)
Noragami Aragoto (Mrs. Iki)

2016
Fukigen na Mononokean (Nara Ashiya)

2017
Hozuki's Coolheadedness (Jigoku Dayu)

2018
Cardcaptor Sakura: Clear Card (Sonomi Daidouji)
Xuan Yuan Sword Luminary (Lady Pong)

2019
Star Twinkle PreCure (AI)

2020
Higurashi: When They Cry – Gou (Miyo Takano)

2021
Higurashi: When They Cry – Sotsu (Miyo Takano)

2022
Uzaki-chan Wants to Hang Out! ω (Haruko Sakurai)

2023
The Tale of the Outcasts (Kate)

Unknown year
The Garden of Sinners: Paradox Spiral (Kaede Enjō)
Hamatora (Naoko Itō)
Kino's Journey (Sakura's mother)
Odin Sphere (Milis)
Project A-ko (A-ko Magami)
Saikin, Imōto no Yōsu ga Chotto Okaishiin Da Ga. (Kyoko Kōzaki)
Sekirei (Takami Sahashi)
Shiki (Nao Yasumori)
Time of Eve (Rina)
Touka Gettan (Juna & Yumiko Kamiazuma)

Original video animation (OVA)
Sol Bianca (1990) (May Jessica)
The Hakkenden (1990) (Princess Fuse Satomi)
Burn Up! (1991) (Reimi)
Battle Angel (1993) (Gally)
Butt Attack Punisher Girl Gotaman (1994) (Saori Minami)
Princess Minerva (1995) (Princess Minerva)
Battle Athletes (1997) (Jessie Gurtland)
Higurashi When They Cry: Rei (2009) (Miyo Takano)

Theatrical animation
Project A-ko (1986) (A-ko)
City Hunter: Bay City Wars (1990) (Miki)
City Hunter: Million Dollar Conspiracy (1990) (Miki)
Doraemon: Nobita and the Kingdom of Clouds (1992) (Paruparu)
Dragon Ball Z: Bio-Broly (1994) (Android 18)
Doraemon: Nobita's Genesis Diary (1995) (Girl)
Hermes – Winds of Love (1997) (Aphrodite)
Doraemon: Nobita Drifts in the Universe (1999) (Rian's Mother)
Crayon Shin-chan: The Storm Called The Jungle (2000) (TV Narrator)
The Garden of Sinners (2007–2009) (Tomoe's Mother(part 5))
Fate/stay night: Unlimited Blade Works (2010) (Taiga Fujimura)
Doraemon: Nobita and the Island of Miracles (2012) (Nobita's Grandmother)
Dragon Ball Z: Battle of Gods (2013) (Android 18)
Dragon Ball Z: Resurrection 'F' (2015) (Android 18)
Fate/stay night: Heaven's Feel I. presage flower (2017) (Taiga Fujimura)
Natsume's Book of Friends Movie (2018) (Touko Fujiwara)
Fate/stay night: Heaven's Feel II. lost butterfly (2019) (Taiga Fujimura)
Dragon Ball Super: Super Hero (2022) (Android 18)

Video games
 Sol Bianca (1990) (May Jessica)
Dragon Ball Z: Super Butōden (1993) (Android 18)
Dragon Ball Z: Ultimate Battle 22 (1995) (Android 18)
Battle Athletes (1996) (Jessie Gurtland)
Gunnm: Martian Memory (1998) (Gally)
Dragon Ball Z: Budokai (2002) (Android 18)
Dragon Ball Z: Budokai 2 (2003) (Android 18)
Dragon Ball Z: Budokai 3 (2004) (Android 18)
Dragon Ball Z: Budokai Tenkaichi (2005) (Android 18)
Super Dragon Ball Z (2005) (Android 18)
Dragon Ball Z: Shin Budokai (2006) (Android 18)
Dragon Ball Z: Budokai Tenkaichi 2 (2006) (Android 18)
Fate/stay night Réalta Nua (2007) (Taiga Fujimura)
Dragon Ball Z: Shin Budokai - Another Road (2007) (Android 18)
Dragon Ball Z: Budokai Tenkaichi 3 (2007) (Android 18)
Dragon Ball Z: Burst Limit (2008) (Android 18)
GetAmped2 (2008) (Linda Bobo)
Dragon Ball Z: Infinite World (2008) (Android 18)
Dragon Ball: Raging Blast (2009) (Android 18)
Dragon Ball Z: Tenkaichi Tag Team (2010) (Android 18)
Dragon Ball: Raging Blast 2 (2010) (Android 18)
Dragon Ball Z: Ultimate Tenkaichi (2011) (Android 18)
Dragon Ball Z: Battle of Z (2014) (Android 18)
Muramasa: The Demon Blade (2014) (Cho Cho Dayu)
Granblue Fantasy (2014) (Cordelia)
Dragon Ball Xenoverse (2015) (Android 18)
Dragon Ball Xenoverse 2 (2016) (Android 18)
Fate/Grand Order (2016) (Jaguar Warrior)
Dragon Ball FighterZ (2018) (Android 18)

Dubbing

Live-action
Bring It On (Courtney (Clare Kramer))
Committed (Joline (Heather Graham))
The Cotton Club (Vera Cicero (Diane Lane))
Emmanuelle (1996 TV Tokyo edition) (Marie-Ange (Christine Boisson))
Fuller House (Kimmy Gibbler (Andrea Barber))
Helix (Dr. Julia Walker (Kyra Zagorsky))
High Fidelity (Laura (Iben Hjejle))
Kate & Leopold (Darci (Natasha Lyonne))
The Mask (Tina Carlyle (Cameron Diaz))
MotherFatherSon (Kathryn Villiers (Helen McCrory))
Mrs. Doubtfire (Lydia "Lydie" Hillard (Lisa Jakub))
Pulp Fiction (Fabienne (Maria de Medeiros))
There's Something About Mary (Mary Jensen (Cameron Diaz))
Under Siege (Jordan Tate/Ms. July (Erika Eleniak))
The War (Lidia Simmons (Lexi Randall))

Animation
A Christmas Carol (Belle)
Finding Dory (Cindy)
Go Jetters (Kyan)

Discography
Higurashi When They Cry Character Case Book 2 (January 16, 2008) – Sang "Bon" and in the drama as Miyo Takano
Higurashi When They Cry Character Case Book 3 (February 14, 2008) – In the drama as Miyo Takano

References

External links
 

1962 births
Living people
Japanese video game actresses
Japanese voice actresses
University of Tsukuba alumni
Voice actresses from Tokyo
20th-century Japanese actresses
21st-century Japanese actresses